Sathish Krishnan is an Indian actor, dancer and choreographer, who has worked in Tamil films.

Career
After winning the first season of the reality dance show, Maanada Mayilada, Sathish was first seen portraying Vinay Rai's friend in Jeeva's Unnale Unnale (2007).  Sathish played a small role in Vaaranam Aayiram (2008) as Suriya's school friend. He also acted in Achcham Yenbadhu Madamaiyada, a film by Gautham Vasudev Menon, as Silambarasan's friend. He was the choreographer for all the songs in Achcham Yenbadhu Madamaiyada.

Filmography

References

External links 

 

Living people
21st-century Indian male actors
Indian film choreographers
Indian male film actors
Tamil male actors
Tamil film directors
1985 births